Gail Simmons (born May 19, 1976) is a Canadian-American food writer and cookbook author. She has served as a permanent judge on Bravo's Emmy-winning series Top Chef since the show's inception in 2006. Simmons was previously the head critic on Top Chef Duels and host of Top Chef: Just Desserts, Bravo's pastry-focused spin-off of the Top Chef franchise. She was also the co-host of The Feed, which aired in 2014 on FYI, A+E's new lifestyle network. In addition to her work on Top Chef, Gail makes frequent television appearances on NBC's Today and ABC's Good Morning America, among others. She has been featured in such publications as New York magazine, Travel + Leisure, GQ, People, Los Angeles Times, and more.

Early life
Simmons was born in Toronto, Ontario, Canada, to a Jewish family of Eastern European origin, and graduated from McGill University in Montreal, where she majored in anthropology and Spanish. She is the daughter of Renee and Ivor Simmons and the youngest of three siblings. Her mother, Renee, was formerly a food columnist for Globe and Mail and conducted cooking classes in their home.

Career

Early career
She began her food journalism career writing restaurant reviews for the McGill Tribune before becoming an intern at the monthly magazine Toronto Life and later wrote for the daily National Post newspaper.

Simmons attended the Peter Kump New York Cooking School in New York City and apprenticed at Le Cirque and Vong.

Simmons worked for food critic Jeffrey Steingarten as his assistant for two years at Vogue before becoming the special events manager for chef Daniel Boulud's restaurant empire for three years.

In 2004, she joined Food & Wine as special projects manager.

Top Chef franchise
Simmons has been a judge with Top Chef since its March 8, 2006 season one premiere; she also hosted the spinoff show, Top Chef: Just Desserts, which premiered on September 15, 2010, after the seventh-season finale of Top Chef.

Publications
Gail's first book, her memoir Talking With My Mouth Full: My Life as a Professional Eater, was published by Hyperion in February 2012.

Video series
She teaches viewers new ways to cook with familiar and unusual staples in their kitchens in the KitchenDaily.com online video series titled The Pantry Project.

Other media
Her Bravo.com bio reports: "Gail makes frequent television appearances on The Today Show, Good Morning America, Fox & Friends, among others."

Appearances
She has made appearances at prominent culinary festivals; examples in the U.S. include the South Beach Wine & Food Festival, New York City Wine & Food Festival, Pebble Beach Food & Wine, Kohler Food & Wine Experience, and the Cayman Cookout.

Community service and board memberships
Gail actively supports Common Threads, an organization that teaches low-income children to cook wholesome, affordable meals. She was a founding member of Food & Wine’s Grow for Good Campaign to raise funds and awareness for sustainable agriculture programs in the United States. She sits on the boards of the American Institute of Wine & Food, Hot Bread Kitchen, the Institute of Culinary Education’s Alumni Committee, the Women at NBCU Advisory Board, and the food rescue organization City Harvest.

Recognition
She was selected for the 2010 Forward 50 by The Jewish Daily Forward.

She has been featured in such media outlets as New York Magazine, Travel + Leisure, GQ, People, TV Guide, Entertainment Weekly, and Los Angeles Times, and was named the #1 Reality TV Judge in America by The New York Post.

Personal life
Simmons married Jeremy Abrams in 2008. Their wedding featured a farmers' market theme and appeared in Martha Stewart's Real Weddings magazine. Simmons wore a Carolina Herrera wedding gown and her mother's veil from 42 years earlier. She said in 2012 she "put a big chunk of savings into his business," Audiostiles which creates background music programming for the hospitality industry. She gave birth to their daughter Dahlia Rae on 29 December 2013. Simmons gave birth to their second child, a son named Kole Jack, on May 23, 2018.

Filmography

Published works

References

External links

 

1976 births
Canadian food writers
Jewish Canadian writers
Living people
McGill University alumni
Participants in American reality television series
Writers from Toronto
Women food writers
Canadian television personalities
Canadian memoirists
Canadian women memoirists